Rivières, sometimes referred to as Rivières-de-Theyrargues, is a commune in the Gard department in southern France.

Population

See also
François Craenhals
Communes of the Gard department

References

Communes of Gard